Route 165 is a state highway in southeastern Connecticut running from Norwich to the Rhode Island state line in Voluntown, and continuing as RI Route 165.

Route description
Route 165 begins at an intersection with Route 2 in eastern Norwich and heads northeast into Preston.  In Preston, it continues east through the town into Griswold. In Griswold, it continues generally east-northeast across Pachaug Pond and Glasgo Pond before continuing into Voluntown. In Voluntown, it heads northeast to overlap Route 49 and Route 138 in a triple concurrency.  It turns east with Routes 49 and 138, then continues east in a concurrency with Route 138.  After leaving Route 138, Route 165 continues east to the Rhode Island state line, meeting RI Route 165.

History
Route 165 was commissioned in 1932, running from Route 2 in Norwich to Route 138 in Voluntown, apparently on a different route around Pachaug Pond in Griswold. Between 1932 and 1936, it was rerouted to its current location crossing Pachaug Pond at its southern end. In 1947, it was extended to the Rhode Island state line.  In 1960, a section in Norwich and Preston was rerouted from Long Society Road to its current location.

Junction list

References

External links

165
Transportation in New London County, Connecticut